Sir Colin James Maiden (born 5 May 1933) is a New Zealand mechanical engineer, university administrator and company director.

Biography
Maiden was born in Auckland on 5 May 1933, the son of Henry Arnold Maiden and Lorna Maiden (née Richardson). He was educated at Auckland Grammar School where he played in the school's 1st XV rugby union team. He then attended Auckland University College completing a Bachelor and Master of Engineering, graduating with the latter degree in 1956. In 1955 he was awarded a Rhodes Scholarship to attend the University of Oxford, where he completed his doctorate in 1957. While at Oxford, Maiden was awarded a tennis Blue.

In 1957, Maiden married Jenefor Mary Rowe, and the couple went on to have four children.

Maiden then took up a research post at the Canadian Armament Research and Development Establishment in Quebec, where he investigated the flight of high-velocity projectiles into space. In 1960 he returned to the School of Engineering at Auckland, and a senior lectureship in mechanical engineering. However, after a year he moved to the General Motors (GM) defence division in Santa Barbara, California, to research hypervelocity flight, and in 1966 he was appointed head of GM's metal-forming and die department in Detroit.

He then served as vice chancellor of the University of Auckland from 1971 to 1994. At his appointment he was the youngest vice chancellor in the Commonwealth, and by the time he left the post he was the longest serving Commonwealth vice chancellor. During this period he served on a number of New Zealand government committees, including the Energy Research and Development Committee and the Liquid Fuels Trust Board.

Following his retirement as vice chancellor, Maiden has held directorships of many leading New Zealand companies including Fisher & Paykel Healthcare, DB Breweries, Mason Industries, Farmers Trading Company, Progressive Enterprises, ANZ Banking Group, Foodland Associated, New Zealand Steel, Winstone, Wilkins & Davies, National Insurance, Tower Corporation, and Independent Newspapers.

The Royal Society of New Zealand awarded the Thomson Medal to Maiden in 1986. In the 1992 New Year Honours, Maiden was appointed a Knight Bachelor, for services to education and business management, and in 1994 he was awarded an honorary LLD by the University of Auckland. He is an Honorary Fellow of his University of Oxford alma mater, Exeter College, where he studied as a Rhodes Scholar.

Maiden's wife, Jenefor, Lady Maiden, died in October 2022.

Honorific eponym
Colin Maiden Park in the Auckland suburb of Saint Johns is named in his honour.

See also
 List of vice-chancellors of the University of Auckland

Bibliography

References

External links
 Tamsyn Parker, A serial director who has seen it all, New Zealand Herald, 2 August 2008, accessed 8 November 2012
 Linda Tyler, From the Collection, Uni News, accessed 8 November 2012
 N.S. Climie, Top University Post, Dr Colin J. Maiden, Ohinemuri Journal #14, October 1970, accessed 8 November 2012
 C.W. Malcolm, Dr Sir Colin Maiden retires, Ohinemuri Journal #39, September 1995, accessed 8 November 2012

1933 births
Living people
People from Auckland
People educated at Auckland Grammar School
University of Auckland alumni
New Zealand Rhodes Scholars
Fellows of Exeter College, Oxford
Academic staff of the University of Auckland
New Zealand businesspeople
New Zealand Knights Bachelor
Vice-Chancellors of the University of Auckland
Businesspeople awarded knighthoods
21st-century New Zealand engineers
20th-century New Zealand engineers